Food for Thought/Take It Back is a compilation album by American post-hardcore band Gray Matter.

Overview
Food for Thought/Take It Back consists of Gray Matter's remastered material that combines, in its entirety, the 1985 Food for Thought studio album and the six-song 1986 Take It Back EP; plus three bonus tracks: two previously unreleased demo recordings, and the first version of "Walk the Line", originally featured on Alive & Kicking, a various artists 7-inch EP compiled in 1985 by WGNS Recordings.

Production
Food for Thought was recorded at Inner Ear Studios in Arlington, Virginia in November 1984, while Take It Back was recorded in August 1985, also at Inner Ear. The bonus tracks were recorded at WGNS Studios, also located in Arlington.

Release
Food for Thought/Take It Back was released by Dischord Records in 1990, on CD and cassette tape.

Track listing

Personnel

Gray Matter
Geoff Turner (credited as Jeff Turner) – vocals, guitar
Mark Haggerty – lead guitar
Steve Niles – bass, backing vocals (tracks 11 to 16) 
Dante Ferrando – drums

Additional performers
Amy Pickering – backing vocals (1 to 10)
Ian MacKaye – backing vocals (1 to 10)
Skeeter Thompson – backing vocals (1 to 10)
John Kirschten – backing vocals (1 to 10)
Molly Burnham – backing vocals (1 to 10)

Production
Gray Matter – production (1 to 10, 17 to 19)
Ian MacKaye – production (1 to 16)
Bert Queiroz – production (1 to 10)
Don Zientara – engineering
Linda Tobin – illustration (front cover)
Liz Goodman – photography (back cover)

Notes

References

External links
 "Dischord Records: Gray Matter,  Food for Thought/Take It Back". Dischord Records. 

1990 compilation albums